Sam Newman (6 January 1901 – 15 October 1937) was an Australian rules footballer who played with St Kilda in the Victorian Football League (VFL).

Notes

External links 

1901 births
1937 deaths
Australian rules footballers from Victoria (Australia)
St Kilda Football Club players
Chelsea Football Club (Australia) players